Dichomeris paulidigitata is a moth in the family Gelechiidae. It was described by Hou-Hun Li, Hui Zhen and Wolfram Mey in 2013. It is found in Kenya.

The wingspan is about 19 mm. The forewings are greyish brown, with scattered brown scales and a dark brown costal margin, with short yellow strigulae on the basal half and a dark brown oval spot below two-fifths. There is a short dark brown streak at one-fourth of the cell, with dark brown spots near the lower angle and the end. There are also dark brown dots at the distal one-fourth on both the costal margin and termen. The hindwings are greyish brown.

Etymology
The species name refers to the small digitate process at middle on the posterior margin of the uncus and is derived from Latin paul- (meaning small) and digitatus (meaning finger like).

References

Moths described in 2013
paulidigitata